Georgetti is a surname. Notable people with the surname include:

 Diena Georgetti (born 1966), Australian painter
 Eduardo Georgetti (1866–1937), Puerto Rican agriculturist, businessman, philanthropist and politician
 Ken Georgetti, Canadian trade unionist
 Wedo Georgetti (1911–2005), American painter, etcher, lithographer and sculptor

See also 

 William Georgetti Scholarship